Keystone Collections Group, owned by Kratzenberg & Associates Inc., is a privately held local tax collections company operating primarily out of Irwin, Pennsylvania, and serving 18 out of the 70 local tax jurisdictions in the state of Pennsylvania as of February 1, 2017. It is the second largest local tax collector in the state by number of districts served.

History  
Pennsylvania Act 32, which was enacted in 2008 and came into effect on January 1, 2012, established county-wide local income tax collection districts (except for Allegheny County), and requires these districts to delegate collection of these taxes to a third-party agent (except for Philadelphia, which is exempted from the law). This act requires all employers to withhold local income taxes and remit those withholdings to the appropriate local tax collection company for any employee who works within the state of Pennsylvania, whether at an employer-owned worksite or a home workplace. As a result, employees who work out of any of the districts currently served by Keystone Collections Group are legally required to have their local income taxes withheld by their employer and remitted to the company, and are responsible for paying any outstanding amount to Keystone each tax year.

Districts Served  
The following is a list of the 18 Pennsylvania local tax districts served by Keystone Collections Group as of February 1, 2017.

References

External links 
 
 List of PA local tax districts and collectors

Companies based in Westmoreland County, Pennsylvania
American companies established in 2002